Petrophile incurvata is a species of flowering plant in the family Proteaceae and is endemic to southwestern Western Australia. It is a shrub with flattened, sometimes pinnately-divided leaves with up to five sharply pointed lobes, and cylindrical to oval heads of silky-hairy, cream-coloured to yellowish-white flowers.

Description

Taxonomy
Petrophile incurvata was first formally described in 1912 by William Vincent Fitzgerald in the Journal of Botany, British and Foreign from material collected by Max Koch near Watheroo. The specific epithet (incurvata) refers to the upwardly-curved leaves.

Distribution and habitat
This petrophile grows in shrubland from Lake Moore near Paynes Find to Wubin in the Avon Wheatbelt, Coolgardie, Geraldton Sandplains and  Yalgoo biogeographic regions of southwestern Western Australia.

Conservation status
Petrophile incurvata is classified as "not threatened" by the Western Australian Government Department of Parks and Wildlife.

References

incurvata
Eudicots of Western Australia
Endemic flora of Western Australia
Plants described in 1912
Taxa named by William Vincent Fitzgerald